Nand Kumar Sai (born 1 January 1946) is an Indian politician and a member of the Bharatiya Janata Party (BJP). He was elected to Lok Sabha, 1989–1991 and 1996–1998, from Raigarh (Lok Sabha constituency) when it was in Madhya Pradesh. In 2004 he was elected a member of the 14th Lok Sabha representing Surguja constituency of Chhattisgarh. He was a Rajya Sabha MP from Chhattisgarh later.

Early life
Nand Kumar Sai was born in the small village of Bhagora in the Jashpur district of the Indian state of Madhya Pradesh. His father was Likhan Sai and his mother was Rupani Devi. He was born into a family of farmers and went on to secure a master's degree in political science from the N.E.S. College formerly Ravishankar University.

Political career
Since student life, deeply moved by the economic plight of Adivasies due to the consumption of liquor and dissuaded them from consumption of liquor, he even went to the extent of giving up the consumption of salt in his food since 1970 to dissuade them from consumption of liquor. 
He served as the President of: (i) N.E.S. College Students' Union from 1972 to 1973 
(ii) B.J.P. District Raigarh from 1980 to 1982
(iii) B.J.P. Madhya Pradesh from 1989
(iv) B.J.P. Chhattisgarh from 2003 to 2004. 
He also served as the General Secretary B.J.P. Madhya Pradesh from 1986 to 1988. He was the Executive Member B.J.P. Madhya Pradesh since 1988. He was the member of National Council of B.J.P. from 1989 to 1991 and National Executive of B.J.P.

Positions held
1977–79 and 1985–89: Member, Madhya Pradesh Legislative Assembly (two terms)
1977–78 and 1986–88: Member, Privileges Committee, Madhya Pradesh Legislative Assembly 
1978–79: Chairman, Committee on the Welfare of Scheduled Castes and Scheduled Tribes, Madhya Pradesh Legislative Assembly 
1988–89: Member, Committee on the Welfare of Scheduled Castes and Scheduled Tribes, Madhya Pradesh Legislative Assembly 
1989–1991: Ninth Lok Sabha Member, from Raigarh (Lok Sabha constituency) in Madhya Pradesh. Committee on the Welfare of Scheduled Castes and Scheduled Tribes 
1990–91: Member, Consultative Committee for the Ministry of Finance Member, Consultative Committee for the Ministry of Home Affairs 
1996–97: Member, Eleventh Lok Sabha (second term),  from Raigarh (Lok Sabha constituency) in Madhya Pradesh
2000–2004: Member, Chhattisgarh Legislative Assembly 
2004–2009: Member, Fourteenth Lok Sabha (third term)- Member, from Surguja (Lok Sabha constituency) in Chhattisgarh. Committee on Private Members Bills and Resolutions Member, Committee on Energy 2004, Member, Consultative Committee for the Ministry of Social Justice and Empowerment
Aug. 2009: Elected to Rajya Sabha 
June 2010: Re-elected to Rajya Sabha. 
Aug. 2010 – May 2014 and Sept. 2014 onward: Member, Committee on Coal and Steel Aug. 2010 – May 2014 Member, Consultative Committee for the Ministry of Urban Development May 2012 – May 2014 and Aug. 2014 onwards Member, Committee on the Welfare of Scheduled Castes and Scheduled Tribes Sept. 
2014 onward: Member, Committee on Social Justice and Empowerment Member, Committee on Papers Laid on the Table. On 28 February 2017, Nand Kumar Sai assumed charge as chairman of National Commission for Scheduled Tribes.

External links
 Home Page on the Parliament of India's Website

1946 births
Bharatiya Janata Party politicians from Chhattisgarh
Living people
India MPs 2004–2009
Chhattisgarh MLAs 2000–2003
Lok Sabha members from Chhattisgarh
People from Raigarh district
Rajya Sabha members from Chhattisgarh
Leaders of the Opposition in Chhattisgarh
India MPs 1996–1997
India MPs 1989–1991
Janata Party politicians